The Waverly Fire was a wildfire near Linden in the San Joaquin County, California, in the United States. The fire was first reported on June 29, 2018. The fire impacted traffic on Highway 26, Highway 4 and the community of Milton.

Events

The Waverly Fire was reported on June 29, 2018, by CALFIRE's air attack in eastern San Joaquin County near Linden. Upon discovery, the fire had burned  of grassland. The fire tripled in size within an hour, with air support being called in by CALFIRE. Milton Road was closed and the community of Milton was evacuated. Evacuation and road closures were lifted. 

References

June 2018 events in the United States
July 2018 events in the United States
Wildfires in San Joaquin County, California
2018 California wildfires